Vandyksdrif is a small village and railway siding in Nkangala District Municipality in the Mpumalanga province of South Africa. It is situated next to the R544 road between Witbank and Bethal and is surrounded by coal mines.

References

Populated places in the Emalahleni Local Municipality, Mpumalanga